Ubundu, formerly known as Ponthierville or Ponthierstad, is a town located in the Tshopo Province of the Democratic Republic of the Congo and is the administrative center of the territory of the same name. It is on the Lualaba River, or Upper Congo, just above the Boyoma Falls. The river is not navigable from here downstream to Kisangani, so a portage railway was built to link Ubundu to Kisangani. Upstream from Ubundu the river is navigable as far as Kasongo.

In 1951, Katharine Hepburn, Humphrey Bogart and the crew of the film The African Queen arrived in Ubundu by train for filming in the jungle. In those days, the town was described as a "pretty colonial outpost".

The area saw some of the worst fighting during the Second Congo War. Around 2003, the town had no electricity, and very few facilities, and was considered a very dangerous place.

See also
 Transport in DRC

References

Populated places in Tshopo